Yorke Sherwood (14 December 1873 – 27 September 1956) was an English actor.

Life

He was born Herbert Edmund Sherwood in Manchester on 14 December 1873.

He moved to California in the 1920s and had multiple supporting roles in Mack Sennett films often supporting Harry Langdon.

He died in Hollywood, California.

Filmography

 Feet of Mud (1924)
 Love's Sweet Piffle (1924)
 Wandering Waistlines (1924)
 The Luck o' the Foolish (1924)
 Cupid's Boots (1925)
 The Haunted Honeymoon (1925)
 Giddap (1925)
 When a Man's a Prince (1926)
 The Man in the Saddle (1926)
 Don Key (1926)
 The Cossacks (1928)
 Thief in the Dark (1928)
 Gentlemen Prefer Blondes (1928)
 Temple Tower (1930)
 The Man from Blankley's (1930)
 The Man in Possession (1931)
 The Lion and the Lamb (1931)
 The Eagle and the Hawk (1933)
 Father Brown, Detective (1934)
 Bulldog Drummond Strikes Back (1934)
 Treasure Island (1934)
 One More River (1934)
 Ever Since Eve (1934)
 King Lady (1935)
 The Perfect Gentleman (1935)
 Thanks A Million (1935)
 Folies Bergére de Paris (1935)
 The Personal History, Adventures, Experience, & Observation of David Copperfield the Younger (1935)
 Clive of India (1935)
 Camille (1936)
 Lloyd's of London (1936)
 Love on the Run (1936)
 The White Angel (1936)
 A Message to Garcia (1936)
 Till We Meet Again (1936)
 The Unguarded Hour (1936)
 London by Night (1937)
 Another Dawn (1937)
 Parnell (1937)
 The Prince and the Pauper (1937)
 Quality Street (1937)
 Mysterious Mr. Moto (1938)
 Dr. Jekyll and Mr. Hyde (1941)
 Scotland Yard (1941)
 Holy Matrimony (1943)
 Two Tickets to London (1943)
 None But the Lonely Heart (1944)
 The Invisible Man's Revenge (1944)
 Jane Eyre (1944)
 The Lodger (1944)
 Devotion (1946)
 23 Paces to Baker Street (1956)

References

External links

1873 births
1956 deaths
English male film actors
20th-century English male actors
English emigrants to the United States